Amorbia dominicana is a species of moth of the family Tortricidae. It is endemic to Dominica.

The length of the forewings is 8.5–9 mm. The ground colour of the forewings is beige with the basal, median, and subterminal anterior fasciae brownish. The hindwings are beige. Adults have been recorded on wing in March, May, June and November.

Etymology
The species name refers to the country of the type locality.

References

Moths described in 2007
Sparganothini
Moths of the Caribbean